This ancient and sovereign order currently only issues passports to three of its officers, all of whom also hold passports issued by other sovereign states. Technically, if they lost their other passports, the three holders of Sovereign Military Order of Malta passports could travel to at least 104 countries and territories without acquiring visas in advance.

Visa requirements map

Visa requirements information and notes

Territories
 – Special permits required.
 Chilean Antarctic Territory – Special permits required.
 – No controls.
 – Visa required.
 Iraqi Kurdistan – Visa on arrival for 10 days for free.
 – Visa required.
 – Unknown passport recognition.
 – Visa required
 – Passport not recognized by New Zealand.
 – Passport not recognized by New Zealand.
 – Passport not recognized by New Zealand.
 – Passport not recognized by the United States.
 – Passport not recognized by the United States.
 – Passport not recognized by the United States.

See also

Sovereign Military Order of Malta passport

References and Notes
References

Notes

External links
 Bilateral relations
 European Union passport regulations on alien passports

Malta|Sovereign Military Order of Malta
Sovereign Military Order of Malta